(died 28 March 741) was a Japanese princess during the Asuka period and the Nara period.

Life 
Hatsusebe was a daughter of Emperor Tenmu. Her mother was Lady Kajihime, whose father was Shishibito no Omi Ōmaro. Her siblings included Prince Osakabe, Prince Shiki, and Princess Taki.

She was made to marry Prince Kawashima, who took part in the conspiracy of the rebellion with Princes Ōtsu, Osakabe, and Shigi in 686, but then betrayed them. Because of his treachery, their plot was exposed before it could be carried out, and the conspirators were all punished except Kawashima.

She never remarried after Kawashima's death in 691, and she died on the 28th day of the 3rd month in 741.

Notes 

Daughters of emperors
Japanese princesses
741 deaths
8th-century Japanese women
Year of birth unknown